Let's Have Fun is a 1943 American film from Columbia Pictures.

It was known as Shall I Tell 'Em. Casting was finalised in July 1942.

Cast
Bert Gordon 
John Beal
Constance Worth

References

External links
Let's Have Fun at BFI
 

1943 films
1943 comedy films
Films directed by Charles Barton